Nano Reid (1 March 1900 – 17 November 1981) was an Irish painter who specialised in landscape, figure painting and portraits.

Early life and education

Nano Reid was born Anne Margaret Reid on 1 March 1900, in Drogheda, County Louth. She was the eldest of four children of Thomas Reid, publican, and Anne Reid (née Downey). The family home was above their pub in Drogheda, with the family also owning a number of properties in the town and in Dublin. Reid attended school at the Siena Convent, where her talent for painting developed. Upon leaving school she initially enrolled to train as a nurse at the Mater Misericordiae University Hospital, but left after two months. Her parents were persuaded by their parish priest, Dr Segrave, to allow Nano Reid to attend the Metropolitan School of Art in Dublin. Whilst there she became an acquaintance of Harry Clarke. Nano Reid taught in at her old school and a boys' school in Drogheda in 1923. She exhibited for the first time at the Royal Hibernian Academy (RHA) in 1925 with three illustrations of poems. Nano Reid exhibited with the RHA periodically until 1968, though never became an academic member.

In 1927, as was common with other Irish painters of the time, Nano Reid went to Paris. Whilst there, she attended to the Académie de la Grande Chaumière for a few months, but the experience doesn't appear to have had an influence on her painting style. She then went to London to attend the Chelsea Polytechnic from 1929 to 1930, which she did not enjoy and after that remained in Ireland.

Artistic career

After returning to Ireland, Nano Reid began to exhibit landscape painting at the RHA. Like other painters of the period, such as Paul Henry, she travelled to the west of Ireland for painting inspiration with her early work showing the landscapes, local people and fisherman of the area. In 1934, she held a solo show at the Society of Dublin Painters at St Stephen's Green. Her second solo show was in 1936 at the Daniel Egan Gallery in Dublin, the show consisted of 53 watercolours and 23 oil paintings. At the request of the Mayor of Drogheda , the collection was rehung in the town.

Nano Reid's sister had taken over the family pub, to which she was a regular visitor while living primarily in Dublin. In Dublin she shared a house with her friend Patricia Hutchins. After WWII, Nano Reid moved to Fitzwilliam Square, sharing with others, including Pearse Hutchinson.

In 1950, Nano Reid and Norah McGuinness were selected to represent Ireland at the Venice Biennale of Art. This was the first time Irish artists participated in this international exhibition, which has been supported by the government of Ireland since then through a range of departments and agencies responsible for foreign affairs, arts and culture.

The Arts Council of Northern Ireland's Chichester Street Gallery, Belfast was the venue for a collection of forty solo works in the summer of 1964. She had previously shown in Belfast as a guest of the Ulster Society of Women Artists and with the Irish Exhibition of Living Art.

Drogheda, the home town of Nano Reid, has not honored her by naming a street, a bridge, or a gallery in her memory.

Work in collections

 Crawford Art Gallery, Cork
 Highlanes Gallery, Drogheda
 Hugh Lane Gallery, Dublin
 Trinity College Dublin
 The Arts Council of Ireland including
 Cave of the Firbola
 Wreckage No.1
 Santa Barbara Museum California
 Irish Institute, New York
 University of Limerick, IACI O'Malley Collection (1) Donkeys on the Aran Shore, (2) Valley Desmond, Gaugan Barra

Quotes

 A born artist and a born stylist...This young artist from Drogheda has to be saluted as a genius.
 Thomas MacGreevy, The Irish Times, 27 November 1942, p. 3 link
 One can say, without pretension, that she has her place in European painting.
 Patrick Swift, Envoy, March 1950 (read article). Reid painted Swift's portrait that year.
 For my money the best Irish painter, mo cheol thú, a Nano.
 Pearse Hutchinson, The Irish Imagination 1959–1971 (1971)

References

References and further reading

 Karen Reihill "Gerard Dillon, Art and Friendships" pdf http://www.adams.ie/cat-pdf/20713.pdf
 "Irish Art from Nathaniel Hone to Nano Reid: The Drogheda Municipal Art Collection in Context". Dr Denise Ferran. Highlanes Gallery (Drogheda). 2006
 
 
 
 Declan Mallon (1994), Nano Reid. Drogheda, Co. Louth: Sunnyside Publications.
 Patrick Swift, Envoy, A Review of Literature and Art, March 1950 read article
 Karen Reihill "Gerard Dillon,Art and Friendships" published by Adams Auctioneers ( www.adams.ie ) Summer Loan Exhibition 2013 http://www.adams.ie/cat-pdf/20713.pdf

External links
 Nano Reid images on Artnet

1900 births
1981 deaths
20th-century Irish painters
Irish women painters
People from Drogheda
Alumni of the Académie de la Grande Chaumière
Alumni of the National College of Art and Design
20th-century Irish women artists